Movement for the Reconstruction of Poland (ROP) was a conservative political party in Poland. It participated in the 1997 parliamentary election for the Sejm, where it received 5.6% of the vote, electing six representatives. During the following elections in 2001, two of its members were elected to the Sejm from the League of Polish Families electoral committee ticket. During the 2007 parliamentary election members of the Movement for the Reconstruction of Poland were elected from a party list endorsed by Law and Justice.

The party ceased its activities on 23 June 2012.

Leaders
Jan Olszewski - founder and party chairman from 1995 to 2011.
Stanisław Gogacz - party chairman from 2011, member of the Polish Senate from 2007.

Members of Polish Parliament (Sejm) 2001-2005
Tadeusz Kędziak, Piotrków Trybunalski
Henryk Lewczuk, Chełm
Jan Olszewski, Warsaw

References

External links
Official web site